Greatest Hits is a compilation album by Biz Markie. It was released on May 7, 2002 for Landspeed Records.

Track listing
"Biz Dance, Pt. 1" – 3:41
"Nobody Beats the Biz" – 5:04
"Biz Is Goin' Off" – 4:51
"Vapors" – 4:33
"I Hear Music" – 3:49
"What Comes Around Goes Around" – 4:06
"Pickin' Boogers" – 4:40
"Make the Music With Your Mouth, Biz" – 5:16
"Just a Friend" – 4:01
"Spring Again" – 4:08
"Young Girl Bluez" – 4:09
"Studda Step" – 4:03
"Busy Doing Nuthin'" – 3:54
"Turn tha Party Out" – 3:23

Biz Markie albums
2002 greatest hits albums